The National Engineering School of Tunis, or ENIT, is the oldest engineering school in the country after the National Agronomic Institute of Tunisia (1898). Part of the University of Tunis - El Manar, it is located at El Manar campus in Tunis.

Establishment 
The National Engineering School of Tunis was founded by Mokhtar Latiri on December 31, 1968.

Departments 
ENIT has six independent departments:
 Industrial engineering
 Mechanical engineering
 Civil engineering
 Electrical engineering
 Information and communication technology
 Applied mathematics

Each department offers different masters and doctorates and has its own research laboratories.

See also
 National Engineering School of Monastir
 National Engineering School of Bizerte
 National Engineering School of Sousse
 National Engineering School of Sfax
 National Engineering School of Gabès
 National Engineering School of Gafsa
 National Engineering School of Carthage
 University of Tunis El Manar

References

External links 
 

Educational institutions established in 1968
Tunis El Manar University